Portrait of a Lady in White is a painting by Titian, made about 1561, of an unknown gentlewoman dressed in white; it is now in the Gemäldegalerie Alte Meister in Dresden.

Identity of the sitter 
Speculation about the sitter has ranged from a young bride to a prostitute or some family member of the artist. Detailed analysis of her jewelry, dress and hairstyle may give more clues, as does the fan she is carrying. It has long been assumed that Titian had depicted his daughter Lavinia in her bridal gown. However, she married six years before this painting was created, and his fourth child and other daughter, Emilia, didn't marry for another seven years. Titian probably created an ideal image of feminine beauty and used a model that he also used in other paintings. The painting was copied by Peter Paul Rubens, and a similar painting is also in the collection at Dresden.

Exhibitions 
The painting was lent to the Columbus Museum of Art in 2018, and to the Norton Simon Museum in 2019.

Copies

Related portraits

References

Lady in White
1560s paintings
Portraits of women